Ajeetgarh (alternatively spelled Ajitgarh) is a town located in Shrimadhopur tehsil in the Sikar district of Rajasthan, India.

Population
Total population is 15414 according to 2011 census.

References

Cities and towns in Sikar district